The National Institute of Agricultural Botany (NIAB) is a plant science research company based in Cambridge, UK.

The NIAB group 

The NIAB group consists of:

 NIAB
 NIAB EMR - a horticultural and agricultural research institute at East Malling, Kent, with a specialism in fruit and clonally propagated crop production. Joined the NIAB Group in 2016.
 NIAB CUF - a potato agronomy unit. Joined the NIAB Group in 2013.
 NIAB TAG - the arable group that joined in 2009
 BCPC - promotes the use of science and technology in the understanding and application of effective, sustainable crop production. Acquired by NIAB in 2018.

History 

NIAB was founded in 1919 by Sir Lawrence Weaver. The original Huntingdon Road headquarters building was opened in 1921, by King George V and Queen Mary.

Regional centres 

NIAB operates 11 regional centres throughout England:

 Cambridge
 Morley (Norfolk)
 East Malling (Kent)
 Sutton Scotney (Hampshire)
 Newton Abbot and Plumber Farm (Devon)
 Hereford
 Telford (Shropshire),
 Benniworth and Kirton (Lincolnshire)
 Headley Hall (Tadcaster, Yorkshire)

A 12th centre was expected to open at Cirencester (Gloucestershire) in 2020.

References

External links
 NIAB

Biological research institutes in the United Kingdom
Botanical research institutes
Research institutes in Cambridge
Research institutes established in 1919
1919 establishments in the United Kingdom
Partner institutions of the University of Cambridge